Kara Zor-El (Supergirl) also known by her adoptive names of Linda Lee Danvers, Kara Kent, Linda Lang, and Kara Danvers, is a superheroine appearing in American comic books published by DC Comics. She was created by Otto Binder and designed by Al Plastino. Danvers first appeared on the story "The Supergirl from Krypton" in Action Comics #252 (May 1959). Kara is the biological cousin of Kal-El, who went on to adopt the name of Clark Kent and the superhero identity Superman. Her father, Zor-El, is the brother of Superman’s father, Jor-El. During the 1980s and the revolution of the Modern Age of Comics, Superman editors believed the character's history had become too convoluted, thus killing Supergirl during the 1985 Crisis on Infinite Earths event and retconning her out of existence.

DC Comics Senior Vice President Dan DiDio re-introduced the character in 2004 along with editor Eddie Berganza and writer Jeph Loeb, with her the Superman/Batman storyline "The Supergirl from Krypton". As the current Supergirl, Kara stars in her own monthly comic book series. With DC's The New 52 relaunch, Kara, like most of the DC Universe, was revamped. DC relaunched the Supergirl comic in August 2016 as part of their DC Rebirth initiative.

In live-action, Supergirl first appeared in the film Supergirl (1984), played by Helen Slater. She later appeared in the television series Smallville, played by Laura Vandervoort, and the Arrowverse series Supergirl, played by Melissa Benoist on the show and also appearing on other Arrowverse series. Sasha Calle will appear as Supergirl in the upcoming DC Extended Universe film The Flash (2023). An upcoming standalone film featuring the character titled Supergirl: Woman of Tomorrow, is in development as an installment of the rebooted DC Universe (DCU) media franchise.
Fictional characters from Chicago

Publication history

Early life
Although Kara Zor-El was the first character to use the name "Supergirl," DC Comics tested three different female versions of Superman prior to her debut. 

The first story to feature a female counterpart to Superman was "Lois Lane – Superwoman," which was published in Action Comics #60 (May 1943). In the story, a hospitalized Lois Lane dreams she has gained superpowers thanks to a blood transfusion from the Man of Steel. She begins her own career as "Superwoman", complete with a version of Superman's costume.

In the Superboy #78 story entitled "Claire Kent, Alias Super-Sister", Superboy saves the life of an alien woman named Shar-La, who turns Superboy into a girl, in retaliation for his disparaging thoughts about women drivers which she picked up telepathically. In Smallville, Clark claims to be Claire Kent, an out-of-town relative who is staying with the Kents. When in costume, he appears as Superboy's sister, Super-Sister, and claims the two have exchanged places. Once Superboy has learned his lesson about feeling more respect for women, Shar-La reveals the episode to be a dream which she projected into Superboy's mind.

In Superman #123 (August 1958), Jimmy Olsen uses a magic totem to wish a "Super-Girl" into existence as a companion and aid to Superman; however, the two frequently get in each other's way until she is fatally injured protecting Superman from a Kryptonite meteor. At her insistence, Jimmy wishes the dying girl out of existence. DC used this story to gauge public response to the concept of a completely new super-powered female counterpart to Superman.

The Kara Zor-El version of Supergirl finally appeared in Action Comics #252 (May 1959). Otto Binder wrote and Al Plastino illustrated her début story, in which Kara was born and raised in Argo City (unnamed until later issues), a fragment of Krypton that survived destruction. When the city is doomed by a meteor shower, Kara is sent to Earth by her parents, Zor-El and Alura In-Ze (the latter unnamed until later issues), to be raised by her cousin Kal-El, known as Superman. Supergirl adopted the secret identity of an orphan "Linda Lee", and made Midvale Orphanage her home. Supergirl promised Superman that she would keep her existence on Earth a secret, so that he may use her as a "secret weapon", but that didn't stop Supergirl from exploring her new powers covertly. Action Comics #255 published reader's letters-of-comment to Supergirl's first appearance; she had allegedly generated a sizeable and mostly positive reaction.

Supergirl, from her debut onwards, became a regular backup strip in Action Comics. She joined the Legion of Super-Heroes, like her cousin had done as a teenager, and in Action Comics #279 (July 1961) she was adopted by Fred and Edna Danvers, becoming "Linda Lee Danvers". Supergirl acted for three years as Superman's secret weapon, and her adventures during that time have been compared to contemporary developments in feminist thinking in work such as Betty Friedan's The Feminine Mystique. She was at last introduced by her super-powered cousin to an unsuspecting world in Action Comics #285 (February 1962).

During her first quarter of a century, Linda Danvers would have many professions, from student to student advisor, to actor, and even TV camera operator. She shared Action Comics with Superman until transferring to the lead in Adventure Comics at the end of the 1960s. In 1972 she finally moved to her own short-lived eponymous magazine, before DC merged its Supergirl, Lois Lane and Jimmy Olsen titles into a single anthology title named The Superman Family. In 1982 Supergirl was relaunched into her own magazine.

Death during Crisis on Infinite Earths

In 1985, the maxi-series Crisis on Infinite Earths was conceived as a way to reduce DC continuity to a single universe in which all characters maintained a single history. Despite Supergirl's continued popularity and status as a central member of the "Superman Family", the editors at DC Comics and the creators of the maxi-series decided to kill Supergirl off during the Crisis. According to Marv Wolfman, writer of Crisis on Infinite Earths:

The idea of killing Supergirl was first conceived by DC's vice president/executive editor Dick Giordano, who lobbied for the death to DC's publishers. He later said he has never had any regrets about this, explaining, "Supergirl was created initially to take advantage of the high Superman sales and not much thought was put into her creation. She was created essentially as a female Superman. With time, writers and artists improved upon her execution, but she never did really add anything to the Superman mythos—at least not for me." The poor initial reception of the 1984 film Supergirl was also blamed by some sources.

In 1989, in the tale "Christmas with the Super-Heroes" the soul of Kara appears to Boston "Deadman" Brand, cheers him up, and then disappears from continuity until 2001 (see below).

Several characters unrelated to Superman soon took on the Supergirl persona, including the Matrix (a shapeshifting genetically engineered life-form that 'defaulted' as Supergirl), Linda Danvers (the result of Matrix merging with the dying Linda Danvers and becoming an Earth-bound angel of fire), and Cir-El (Superman's apparent daughter from a possible future).

A heroine resembling the Pre-Crisis Kara would later appear in Final Crisis: Legion of 3 Worlds #5, along with an entire army of Legionnaires gathered from alternate worlds, times, and realities, to battle the Time Trapper.

Two Supergirls meet 
Prior to the post-Crisis introduction of Kara Zor-El into mainstream continuity, the pre-Crisis Kara Zor-El made an appearance in Peter David's Supergirl: Many Happy Returns. The then-current Supergirl series, at the time starring Linda Danvers, was in danger of cancellation and Peter David thought a story arc involving Kara Zor-El would be enough to revitalize the series. In an interview with Cliff Biggers of Newsarama, David states:

In the Linda Danvers' Supergirl series issues 49 and 50 (October and November 2000), the original dead Kara appears as Linda's "guardian angel". Then in issues 75 to 80, "Many Happy Returns", a young Kara appears from an earlier time long before the Crisis. The paradox becomes a moral crisis for Linda who tries to take her place as the Crisis sacrifice, living for years in a Silver Age universe where "no one swears, the villains are always easy to defeat, and everything's very, very clean", eventually marrying the Silver Age Superman and having a daughter with him, before she is forced to return to her universe by the Spectre when he reveals that her efforts to replace Kara as the sacrifice will not succeed. This run was illustrated by Ed Benes who had also illustrated Gail Simone's Birds of Prey which had a similar whimsical camaraderie between its female leads.

Linda's inability to ultimately save Kara, coupled with the loss of her daughter, is so devastating that it ends her own career as Supergirl, Linda leaving a note for Superman where she explains that she feels that she has failed to live up to the standards of a true Supergirl and choosing to go somewhere she cannot be found. This story arc is usually cited as one of the best Supergirl stories ever written. The series ended with issue 80.

Revival 

After the launch of the Superman/Batman comic book series, executive editor Dan DiDio had been looking for a way to simplify the Supergirl character from her convoluted post-Crisis history; the simplest version, of course, was Superman's cousin. Jeph Loeb and editor Eddie Berganza found an opening to reintroduce the character following the conclusion of the first story arc of Superman/Batman. Loeb states:

The modern version of Kara Zor-El made her debut in Superman/Batman #8 (2004). Kara takes the mantle of Supergirl at the conclusion of the storyline. The Supergirl comic book series would later be relaunched, now starring Kara Zor-El as "The Girl of Steel". The first arc of the new series was written by Jeph Loeb and illustrated by Ian Churchill. Loeb would later describe the appeal of writing for Supergirl:

As the character continued to be reinvented, steps towards regarding the iconic character were some of the most prominent changes. Artist Jamal Igle and editor Matt Idleson moved to transition the character away from red panties under her skirt to biker shorts, feeling such a change was a logical progression and "more respectable."

The New 52
In September 2011, DC Comics began The New 52, in which it canceled all of its monthly superhero titles and relaunched 52 new ones, wiping out most of its past continuity in the process. One of the new titles was a new Supergirl series (Volume 6) that featured a new origin for Kara and was published between 2011 and 2015. Artist Mahmud Asrar designed a new costume for the character which strongly deviated from her classic, "cheerleader" suit, a change which generated criticism from some readers.

DC Rebirth
The 2016 DC Comics title relaunch Rebirth incorporates several elements (such as the costume, the name, the setting, and some characters) from the Supergirl television series. The DC Rebirth initiative undid the New 52's modern recreations, bringing DC's heroes back to their more classic iterations. Supergirl's new series (Volume 7) was titled Supergirl: Rebirth, written by Steven Orlando. The first arc was penciled by Brian Ching, who also redesigned Supergirl's costume in reference to a more classic look. In April 2018, it was announced that the title would be canceled after issue #20, only to be revived in August that year under a new creative team, with new writer Marc Andreyko and artist Kevin Maguire. The series ended with its 42nd issue.

Future State: Kara Zor-El, Superwoman
The Future State comics propose a possible future for Kara Zor-El, now an adult and having taken the alias of Superwoman. She leaves Earth to become a guardian of the Moon, which has become a refugee colony for aliens from the entire universe. The series was written by Marguerite Bennet and penciled by Marguerite Sauvage.

Supergirl: Woman of Tomorrow
Under the Infinite Frontier brand, Kara's next series Woman of Tomorrow debuted in June 2021, written by Tom King and penciled by Brazilian artists Bilquis Evely and Mat Lopes. The arc introduces Supergirl to new character grounds as she begins the story as a young woman, celebrating her 21st birthday and helping a young alien in her quest for revenge. The "mentor-mentee journey on revenge" plot is, according to King, inspired by the original novel and both versions of  True Grit. 

In this series, the creators paid homage to Linda Danvers, as Kara manifests flame wings and powers after taking a red kryptonite drug to save her space bus crew from a Karpane dragon.

Fictional character biography

Silver Age
In her debut story, Kara Zor-El is the last survivor of Argo City of the planet Krypton. Although Argo, which had survived the explosion of the planet, drifted through space as a self-sustaining environment, the soil of the colony eventually turned into Kryptonite; and though Kara's father Zor-El placed lead sheeting above the ground to protect the citizens from radiation, meteorites pierced the sheeting, and the Kryptonians died of radiation poisoning instead of replacing the metal.

In Supergirl's subsequent backup feature in Action Comics drawn by artist Jim Mooney for ten years until 1968, Supergirl adopts the identity of Linda Lee, an orphan at Midvale Orphanage presided over by headmistress Miss Hart. She disguises herself by hiding her blond hair beneath a brunette wig; Supergirl interacts with humans on a person-to-person basis performing good deeds and saving the world by helping one person at a time, and she also devises clever schemes as "Superman's Secret Weapon," saving him many times and avoiding adoption before Superman can introduce her publicly.

While temporarily powerless due to the scheming of Kandorian scientist Lesla-Lar, who is out to supplant her on Earth, Linda allows herself to be adopted by engineer and rocket scientist Fred Danvers and his wife, Edna. In time, she reveals her secret identity to her adoptive parents on the same day her cousin Superman finally introduces her to the world in the finale of then-DC's longest playing series ever (eight chapters) aptly called "The World's Greatest Heroine".

When frequent dreams about her parents being alive turn out to be real, she builds a machine aided by her engineer father's talent, and brings them both back alive from the "Survival Zone" where they had both teleported during Argo City's final moments. Zor-El and Allura eventually end up living in Kandor, and when the city in the bottle is enlarged, they both go on to live in Rokyn/New Krypton, where they have the sad duty of receiving her mortal remains after "Crisis" for burial.

Graduating from high school in 1965, Linda Lee goes to college on a scholarship and stays in Stanhope College until she graduates in 1971. During this era, she is helped by her pet cat Streaky, her Super-Horse pet Comet, and befriends Lena Thorul, who had first appeared in the Lois Lane series. Kara is also a member of the Legion of Super-Heroes, where she becomes close to Brainiac 5. In addition, Linda has boyfriends from the orphanage (Richard "Dick" Malverne) and from Atlantis (Jerro the merboy).

In 1967, Supergirl meets Batgirl for the first time in World's Finest Comics. Developing a strong friendship, the two characters teamed up many times again, as in Superman Family #171, or Adventure #381.
In 1969, Supergirl left Action Comics and became a featured character in Adventure Comics beginning with issue #381 (June 1969).

During the 1970s, Supergirl's costume changed frequently, as did her career in her civilian life. In her secret identity as Linda Lee Danvers, Kara Zor-El took a variety of jobs including graduate student in acting, television camera operator, and student counselor, and finally became an actress on the TV soap Secret Hearts.

Bronze Age
After long-time Superman family editor Mort Weisinger retired in 1971, the character underwent revitalization under editor Joe Orlando and artist Mike Sekowsky. Wearing a series of new outfits, leaving her adopted foster home with the Danvers family, Linda goes on to San Francisco where she works for KSF-TV as a camera operator and develops a crush on her boss, Geoffrey Anderson. These stories introduced Supergirl's most memorable villain from this period: Lex Luthor's niece Nasthalthia, or Nasty. Nasty had made two appearances towards the end of Linda's college years, then pursued her to KSF-TV, trying to secure proof of her dual identity.

Supergirl starred in her first solo eponymous monthly series beginning in 1972 until October 1974, when her monthly title merged with Superman's Girl Friend, Lois Lane, and Superman's Pal Jimmy Olsen to produce a new title: then-highest DC selling series called The Superman Family, where she eventually became the steady lead story. Linda worked as a student advisor at New Athens Experimental School, before leaving for New York to follow a career in acting with daytime soap Secret Hearts.

In 1982 Supergirl received a second monthly solo series titled The Daring New Adventures of Supergirl, relocating the character to Chicago as Linda became a mature student of Psychology. Industry legend, and former DC Publisher, Carmine Infantino provided the penciled art (Bob Oksner inked). With issue 13 the title was revamped, with a new costume design (sporting a red headband) and the title shortened to just Supergirl. The series ran until sudden cancellation in 1984, only two months before the character's debut in a big-budget Hollywood film starring Helen Slater.

In the Crisis on Infinite Earths (1985), the greatest heroes from Earth-One, Earth-Two, Earth-Four, Earth-S, and Earth-X join forces to defeat the Anti-Monitor. When Superman comes face to face with the Anti-Monitor and is knocked unconscious, Supergirl rushes to save him before he is killed. She is able to fight him off long enough for Dr. Light to carry her cousin to a safe distance, but is killed by the Anti-Monitor. A public memorial service for Supergirl takes place in Chicago, where Batgirl (Barbara Gordon) delivers the eulogy. In her remarks, she states "Kara is a hero. She will not be forgotten." Superman then gives his late cousin burial by taking her corpse to Rokyn/New Krypton to Zor-El and Allura. A Superman issue the next month reveals that Kara had experienced a premonition about her own passing. However, when the universe is rebooted, the timeline is altered. Kara Zor-El and all memory of her is erased from existence.

Echoes
After these events, the soul of Kara Zor-El made another appearance in continuity three years later in a story titled "Should Auld Acquaintance Be Forgot" in Christmas with the Super-Heroes #2 (1989). Within the story, Deadman tries to feel the warmth of Christmas by possessing revelers' bodies. Feeling guilty upon the realization that he has been stealing others' Christmases, he flies off feeling sorry for himself for being denied a reward after a year of helping people. A warmly dressed blonde woman approaches Brand, startling him. Somehow seeing the normally invisible Brand, she converses with him, reminding him,

She reminds Brand that even though he is dead, he is still human, and he should rejoice because it means his spirit is still alive. As the woman leaves, Brand asks her who she is, to which she replies, "My name is Kara. Though I doubt that will mean anything to you." The story, written by Alan Brennert and penciled by Dick Giordano, is dedicated to Otto Binder and Jim Mooney, adding: "We still remember."

Finally, the soul of Kara Zor-El appeared twice during Peter David's run, specifically in issues #49 and #50 when she appears before a defeated and imprisoned then-Supergirl, Linda Danvers from Earth, and comforts her. Linda acknowledges she has been helped three times by her phantom-friend, and when she asks her name she is told by the smiling figure: "I have gone by many names, but the one I am most fond of is: Kara!"

Modern Age

In 2004, Jeph Loeb reintroduced Kara Zor-El into post-Zero Hour (Birthright timeline) continuity during a storyline in the series Superman/Batman. She is the biological cousin of Superman, and although chronologically older than him, the ship in which she traveled to Earth was caught in a large green Kryptonite meteorite which held her in a state of suspended animation for much of the journey, making her have the appearance of a 16-year-old girl. Still, Supergirl sometimes saw Superman as a child, due to last carrying him as a baby. DC Comics relaunched the Supergirl, the first story arc of which was written by Loeb. showcases Supergirl on a journey of self-discovery. Along her journey, she encounters Power Girl (Kara Zor-El's counterpart from another universe), the Teen Titans, the Outsiders, the Justice League of America, and arch-villain Lex Luthor.

During the company-wide crossover series Infinite Crisis (2005), a sequel to Crisis on Infinite Earths, Supergirl is transported to the 31st century, where she is revered as a member of the Superman family and joins the Legion of Super-Heroes. DC Comics renamed the monthly series Legion of Super-Heroes to Supergirl and the Legion of Super-Heroes. Beginning with issue #16. In the limited series 52, which chronicles the events that took place during the missing year after the end of Infinite Crisis, Donna Troy recalls the original Kara Zor-El and her sacrifice to save the universe. Supergirl returns to the 21st century during the course of 52. After briefly filling in for a temporarily depowered Superman as guardian of Metropolis, she assumes the identity of Flamebird to fight crime in the bottle city of Kandor with Power Girl as Nightwing in Greg Rucka's arc Supergirl: Kandor.

In 2007, Supergirl appeared in the miniseries Amazons Attack! That same year, she joined the Teen Titans for five issues.

Conversations with other heroes who maintain secret identities lead Kara to the conclusion that she needs to make a deeper connection with human beings. She accepts Lana Lang's proposal to present her to the Daily Planet staff as "Linda Lang", Lana's teenaged niece.

In the 2008–2009 "New Krypton" story arc, in which Superman discovers and frees the real Kandor and a large number of its citizens, Supergirl is reunited with her father, Zor-El and mother, Alura, though Zor-El is killed by the villain Reactron. When a planet is formed that the Kryptonians call New Krypton, Kara is torn between her life on Earth, and her obligation to her mother, eventually joining the New Krypton Science Guild.

Supergirl subsequently appears in the 2009 miniseries Justice League: Cry for Justice, and the 2009–2010 storyline "Blackest Night". The New Krypton storyline would later be resolved in the "World of New Krypton", "Superman: Last Stand of New Krypton", "War of the Supermen" storylines, resulting in the destruction of New Krypton and seeing Supergirl mourn her people.

Supergirl subsequently appears in the 2010 "Brightest Day" storyline, the follow up to "Blackest Night"., where she joins the Justice League along with Jesse Quick and Jade.

The New 52
In this continuity, Kara's ship lands in Smallville, but hurtles through the Earth and emerges in Siberia.

Kara has no memory of the destruction of Krypton, and believes it is only three days since her spacecraft was launched. She learns the truth about Krypton's destruction from Superman, and later journeys through a wormhole to Argo City, which she finds in orbit around a blue sun. She finds the city in ruins, with no explanation of how it met that fate, and is attacked by a female Worldkiller named Reign before the city plummets into the sun. When Reign and her fellow Worldkiller plan to enslave the Earth, Supergirl returns there to defeat them, and thus adopts Earth as her new home.

After several battles with supervillains, including the Worldkillers, superweapons of Kryptonian design, she accepts Krypton's destruction, but continues to grapple with her grief. Her desire to restore Krypton results in her being manipulated into nearly destroying the Earth by another Kryptonian whom she falls in love with. Upon realizing his manipulation, she kills him by driving Kryptonite through his heart, and succumbs to Kryptonite poisoning.

Following her poisoning, Supergirl departs the Earth to die alone. While adrift in interstellar space, she encounters a planet under attack by monsters, and quickly intervenes to save them, unaware that the entire planet is a trap by Brainiac. She is captured and restrained by Cyborg Superman, but after a struggle, manages to escape both Brainiac and Cyborg Superman. Returning to Earth, she is sent into the past by the Oracle alongside Superman and Superboy, where she ensures that a resurrected H'el cannot save Krypton, and sacrifices the planet and her family to save the universe.

Back on Earth, she encounters the assassin Lobo. Initially eager for a peaceful resolution, seeing a kind of kinship with him in their both being lone survivors of their respective worlds (although not truly aware of Lobo's circumstances), Kara's encounter with the Czarnian would reveal deep mental wounds, resulting in the unleashing of her rage and transformation into a Red Lantern. Driven insane by rage, Kara wanders space, attacking everyone in her way, until captured by several Green Lanterns and brought to Hal Jordan. Immediately recognizing a Kryptonian and unable to remove the power ring without killing her, he brings her to Guy Gardner, the leader of one of the two Red Lantern factions, who manages to restore her sanity.

After some time under Guy Gardner's tutelage and protecting the galaxy as a Red Lantern, Kara is discharged from the Red Lantern Corps. On her way back to Earth, she encounters the leader of the Worldkillers, who are revealed to be parasitic suits of armor. He attempts to assimilate Kara as his host, but she voluntarily subjects herself to Kryptonite poisoning to stop him, and flies into the Sun, killing her and removing him from her body. However, Kara is revealed to be immortal while in the Sun's core and is revived, immediately destroying the Worldkiller. She later helps Guy against Atrocitus and his Red Lantern splinter group.

Convergence and return of the Pre-Crisis version
During the Convergence story arc, the original Kara Zor-El who had sacrificed her life during Crisis on Infinite Earths makes an appearance on the amalgamated planet of Telos. At the end of the saga she volunteers herself to once again fight the Anti-Monitor but this time, with the help of her timeline's Barry Allen, the Pre-Flashpoint Superman (in tow with his pregnant wife, Lois Lane), and a repentant Parallax (Zero Hour Hal Jordan), vows to defeat him for the sake of the multiverse's continued existence. Without it being seen, those left on Telos discover the group was successful and all previous timelines (with the mysterious exception of the pre-Flashpoint/pre-New 52 DC universe) from DC history had been re-established, though the fate of the original Kara Zor-El and her fellows went unmentioned.

A few more details of the battle against the Anti-Monitor are later revealed during the New 52 comic mini-series (leading into DC's Rebirth event). After the defeat of Anti-Monitor, Pre-New 52 Clark and Lois decide to start life anew in the closest universe they can find (mysteriously yet unable to see their old universe even though the rest of the multiverse had been restored) while Pre-Crisis Kara Zor-El, along with her contemporary Barry Allen and Zero Hour Parallax/Hal Jordan, decide to find their place in the universe and go off to do so. Her fate as of that story arc is yet to be revealed.

DC Rebirth
After the events that led to the death of the New 52 version of Superman, 16-year-old Kara lives in National City with her adoptive parents, D.E.O. agents Jeremiah and Eliza Danvers, where she attends high school and works with the agency as led by Cameron Chase. As part of her civilian identity, Kara receives special glasses that darken her blond hair when posing as Kara Danvers. Kara also goes on an internship at Cat Grant's CATCO alongside Ben Rubel, whom she befriends.

In her opening arc "The Reign of the Cyborg Supermen", Kara discovers that the cyborg Zor-El, whom she had battled in her New 52 title, is still active and has rebuilt other Kryptonians (her mother Alura included), planning to take over Earth. Supergirl defeats them but vows to help her father regardless of his actions. After National City discovers Supergirl has kept Zor-El's "living" status a secret, they become mistrustful of her. Director Bones takes advantage of the heroine's unpopularity and, after taking control of the D.E.O., sends villains in an attempt to bring Kara down. She defeats all of them and regains trust from National City with Ben's help.

The Supergirl Who Laughs
Kara is later infected by The Batman Who Laughs toxin, causing her to turn evil and joining other infected as part of Laughs Secret Six before later being cured. She is fired from CatCo by Cat Grant and starts working at S.T.A.R. Labs.

Woman of Tomorrow
Journeying throughout the universe with Krypto, Kara celebrates her 21st birthday alone on a distant planet. Drunk in a bar, she is approached by a little girl named Ruthye and is asked to kill Krem (her father's murderer) in vengeance. Supergirl refuses but, when she is about to leave the planet, Krem attacks and severely wounds both her and Krypto, fleeing in Kara's ship. Kara begins her journey alongside Ruthye and, powerless, saves her space bus crew from a Karpane dragon by taking a red kryptonite drug which causes her to manifest flame wings.

Powers and abilities

A yellow sun gives her the powers akin to that of a goddess. Like all Kryptonians under a yellow sun, the current version of Kara Zor-El possesses virtually unlimited strength, stamina, and invulnerability. She is able to fly and with super speed that she can also use on foot, similar to Superman and The Flash. Also like Superman, Supergirl possesses super senses, super-breath, and freeze breathe, as well as multiple forms of supervision (including X-Ray, Infrared, Telescopic, and Microscopic). Kara also has a bio-electric aura that enhances her near invulnerability and also protects her skin and her costume from dirt and tear; as such, Kara is perpetually clean. The Sun also provides Kara with a longer lifespan than that of a human being, to the point that she is effectively a biological immortal. Kara doesn't require food, water, or sleep to survive. She is also immune to most diseases, mental and physical, and would require a very strong strain to have a chance at affecting her.

In the rare instances that Kara is harmed by someone matching her strength or by the use of one of her weaknesses, she can heal almost instantaneously. Her power surpasses most other beings, though she can be overpowered by those who rival her strength such as Black Adam, Darkseid, Despero, Doomsday, Bizarro, Wonder Woman, and Superman.

In reality, Kara is actually older than her cousin, Clark, and spent time on Krypton before its destruction. As such (unlike Superman), she possesses memories of Kryptonian culture as well as her cousin's parents.

Continued exposure to a yellow Sun will slowly increase abilities. Many characters in the DC Universe have noted that Supergirl appears, at times, to be even more powerful than Superman himself. In answer to this, Superman states that this is because he has spent his entire life subconsciously suppressing his full powers to avoid hurting others, having been absorbing solar radiation since his infancy. Kara, not having such practice or experience, simply uses the full magnitude of her powers.

Martial artistry
Unlike her cousin, Kara was taught to fight in Krypton as part of her tests, and at the Crucible Academy, being adept at various Kryptonian fighting styles like Klurkor and Torquasm Rao. Supergirl also learned the art of Bagua under I-Ching's instructions. She practiced how to manipulate her Chi or Qi to gain better control of her powers due to them becoming overwhelmed after her conflict with the Fatal Five. Superman recommended guardianship with I-Ching to Supergirl first. In addition to training in Krypton, Kara was trained by Batman in advanced martial arts and trained with the Amazons in Themyscira in unarmed and armed combat, Amazonas martial arts, fencing, Shield handling, and other Amazon weapons. She trained with Wonder Woman and Artemis extensively.

Other versions

There are numerous alternate versions of Supergirl. The most notable is Power Girl (real name Kara Zor-L, also known as Karen Starr) who first appeared in All Star Comics #58 (January/February 1976).

Power Girl is the Earth-Two counterpart of Supergirl and the first cousin of Kal-L, Superman of the pre-Crisis Earth-Two. The infant Power Girl's parents enabled her to escape the destruction of Krypton. Although she left the planet at the same time that Superman did, her ship took much longer to reach Earth-Two.

She has superhuman strength and the ability to fly and is the first chairwoman of the Justice Society of America. She sports a bob of blond hair; wears a distinctive white, red, and blue costume; and has an aggressive fighting style. Throughout her early appearances in All Star Comics, she is often at odds with Wildcat because his penchant for talking to her as if she were an ordinary human female rather than a superpowered Kryptonian annoys her.

She also fought alongside the Sovereign Seven team, replacing Rampart after his death though that series is not considered to be part of canon in the DC universe.

The 1985 limited series Crisis on Infinite Earths eliminated Earth-Two, causing her origin to change; she became the granddaughter of the Atlantean sorcerer Arion. However, story events culminating in the 2005–2006 Infinite Crisis limited series restored her status as a refugee from the Krypton of the destroyed pre-Crisis Earth-Two universe.

Like the original Kara's Streaky, Power Girl has a cat, featured in a story by Amanda Conner in Wonder Woman #600.

Reception
This version of Supergirl is ranked as the 153rd-greatest comic book character of all time by Wizard magazine.

IGN also ranked this version of Supergirl as the 94th-greatest comic book superhero, stating "for a character born of the Silver Age that saw everything from a Super Baby to a Super Monkey, Kara Zor-El grew into something much more than simply another marketing ploy to slap an 'S' on." In 2013 IGN ranked Supergirl as the 17th-greatest DC comic superhero, stating "she was an early example of a female sidekick developing a large fanbase in her own right", and "Supergirl has been one of DC's most powerful heroes, and a standard to hold other female heroes against."

Appearances

Pre-Crisis
 1959 to 1969: Action Comics #252 to #376.
 1969 to 1972: Adventure Comics #381 to #424.
 1972 to 1974: Supergirl #1 to #10.
 1974 to 1982: Her comic merges with Jimmy Olsen's and Lois Lane's to become Superman Family #164 to #222.
 1982 to 1984: The Daring New Adventures of Supergirl #1 to #13, Supergirl (vol. 2) #14 to #23.
 2015: Convergence

Kara Zor-El appeared in over 750 stories published by DC from 1959 to 1985.

Post-Crisis

 2004 to 2005: Superman/Batman #8 to #13 and #19
 2005 to 2011: Supergirl (vol. 5) #0 to #67
 2006 to 2008: Supergirl and the Legion of Super-Heroes (Legion of Super-Heroes vol. 5) #16 to #37
 2007: Action Comics #850
 2008: Final Crisis
 2011 to 2015: New 52: Supergirl (vol. 6) #1 to #40
 2016 to current: Rebirth: Supergirl (vol. 7) #1 to current

Kara Zor-El also appears as a supporting character in several issues of other DC Comics, including Superman, Action Comics, Teen Titans, Amazons Attack, World War III, and Wonder Girl. She has also appeared in many issues of Superman, Action Comics, and Superman New Krypton starting with the World Without Superman event in 2009, and continuing with the World Against Superman event going into 2010.

Collected editions
Listed in chronological order. All ages titles are not in continuity with the original or modern Kara.

In other media

Television

Live-action

Smallville
 Prior to the seventh season (2007–2008) of the WB/CW show Smallville where she is introduced into the cast and is portrayed by Laura Vandervoort, a woman claiming to be Kara (portrayed by Adrianne Palicki) is briefly introduced in the season 3 finale. It is later revealed her real name is Lindsey Harrison, and had been given false memories and powers by the artificial intelligence of Clark Kent's (Tom Welling) father Jor-El as part of a series of tests. Vandervoort portrays the real Kara, Clark's cousin whose spaceship had been trapped in stasis until the events of the season 6 finale. Much of season 7 is concerned with Kara's attempts to adjust to life on Earth, especially after learning of Krypton's destruction. Her storyline sees her simultaneously become the object of Lex Luthor's (Michael Rosenbaum) obsessions and Jimmy Olsen's (Aaron Ashmore) affections, suffer a bout of amnesia, discover her father's (Christopher Heyerdahl) sinister motives and become a target of evil android Brainiac (James Marsters). The season finale sees Kara become trapped in the Phantom Zone. Starting with season 8, Vandervoort ceases to feature as a series regular, but reprises the role three more times. In her first guest appearance, "Bloodline," Kara is freed from the Phantom Zone and later departs Clark's hometown of Smallville to search for Kandor, her birthplace, as it is rumored to have survived their home planet's destruction. She appears again in the season 10 episode "Supergirl", in which she formally adopts her superhero moniker. Her off-screen adventures are alluded to thereafter. Vandervoort makes a final appearance in the show's penultimate episode, "Prophecy", in which she helps Green Arrow (Justin Hartley) locate the "Bow of Orion" to use against Darkseid. She is then called to the Fortress of Solitude, where she learns from Jor-El that her job on Earth is done. Using a Legion of Super-Heroes flight ring, she travels to the future to seek her own destiny. The Season Eleven comic book continuation of the show later depicts Kara's continued story in the 31st century, subsequent return to the present and joining the Justice League.

Arrowverse

 In September 2014, a 22-episode television series centered around Supergirl was in development at Warner Bros. Television, set to premiere on CBS with a January 2015 air date. Melissa Benoist was cast as the titular character. In May 2016, the series moved to The CW and was later integrated into the Arrowverse, a shared universe consisting of shows including Arrow, The Flash and Legends of Tomorrow. In the series, Kara Zor-El was sent to Earth to protect her cousin Kal-El, following her homeworld Krypton's destruction. However, she is knocked into the Phantom Zone, where she is stranded for 24 years. She eventually crash lands on Earth and is found by her already grown-up cousin Kal, now known to the world as the iconic superhero "Superman". Superman brings Kara into the custody of Jeremiah Danvers, director of the Department of Extranormal Operations (D.E.O.), and his daughter Alex. Growing up, Kara struggles to maintain her Kryptonian abilities as well as balancing her relationship with her adoptive sister. Eventually, the two bond when Kara's powers are exposed. However, Jeremiah decides it's best to isolate her abilities. As an adult, Kara is forced to use her powers again when her sister's plane almost crashes. She is later dubbed "Supergirl" by the media and dons a costume like her cousin. Kara decides to use her abilities to fight alien invaders such as Kara's aunt Astra and her husband Non, Mon-El's rogue parents, the Worldkiller Reign, anti-alien activist Ben Lockwood, and later the shadowy organization Leviathan, with the help of her sister Alex, now an agent of the D.E.O., her best friend and tech-expert Winn Schott, last of the Green Martians J'onn J'onzz / Martian Manhunter, and Kal's best friend Jimmy Olsen. She is later joined by Lex Luthor's sister Lena, Prince of Daxam Mon-El, former Legion of Superheroes member Querl "Brainy" Dox / Brainiac 5, Nia Nal / Dreamer, James' younger sister Kelly, and reporter Willam Dey face against these rival forces. After joining the Arrowverse, which contain annual crossover, Kara assists Barry Allen, Oliver Queen and the Legends of Tomorrow against threats on their designated earth "Earth-1" while Kara’s is designated as "Earth-38". Later, Kara is selected by The Monitor as the Paragon of Hope to participate in the coming crisis and fight against the Anti-Monitor, whose goal is to destroy the multiverse. After doing so, the Paragons are sent to the Vanishing Point where Oliver, now a Spectre, helps them escape. The Paragons appear at the dawn of time in the anti-matter universe where they have their final confrontation with the Anti-Monitor. Eventually, Oliver sacrifices himself to kill the Anti-Monitor, and as a result, a new multiverse is born with Earth-38 and Earth-1 merged into "Earth-Prime". Following the crisis, Kara is forced to deal the after-effects of Crisis which include working with Lex, now owning the D.E.O. while Leviathan continue their covert operations under Gamemnae. The sixth season sees Kara and her allies expose Lex's crimes, but are then forced to deal with Nyxlygsptlnz, a fifth-dimensional imp who tricked the heroes into releasing her from the Phantom Zone. Eventually Nyxlygsptlnz joins forces with Lex Luthor and the two kill William, but Kara's assembled allies are able to defeat the two, culminating in Lex and Nyxlygsptlnz being trapped in the Phantom Zone when one of their own plans backfires. The series concludes with Kara revealing her dual identity so that she can live a full life as one person.

Animation 
 Supergirl appears with Batgirl and Wonder Girl in Super Best Friends Forever, voiced by Nicole Sullivan.
 Supergirl appears as a central protagonist in DC Super Hero Girls, voiced by Anais Fairweather in the 2015 web series and Nicole Sullivan in the 2019 series. This version is a rebellious "cool kid" and student at Super Hero High School. She may be tough but she can easily express her emotions and is very open-minded as well. She can be a cool friend and a helpful one, but she can also be jealous sometimes and she dislikes her cousin's prominence.
 Supergirl appears in Justice League Action, voiced by Joanne Spracklen.
 Supergirl has a non-speaking appearance in the Young Justice series finale "Death and Rebirth". In a post-credit sequence, she is one of dozens of rogue Kryptonians recovered from the Phantom Zone, being implied to have been sent there two decades by Dru-Zod for reasons unknown. She is last seen being offered as tribute by the Light and recruited to the Female Furies alongside Black Mary.

Film

Live-action
 A live action depiction of Supergirl first appears in the eponymous 1984 film starring Helen Slater as Supergirl. The film is a spin-off from the Superman film series starring Christopher Reeve, to which it is connected by Marc McClure's character of Jimmy Olsen.
 Kara Zor-El / Linda Danvers / Supergirl exists within the DC Extended Universe, as she was referenced in Man of Steel when Superman discovers an empty pod within the Kryptonian scout spaceship. Zack Snyder confirmed in August 2018 that even though the character does exist, the pod was not intended for her.
 In August 2018, a film centered around the character was announced to be in development, with Oren Uziel hired as screenwriter for the project. The studio intends to hire a female director, with Reed Morano—who has expressed interest in the project—being its top choice. Filming was expected to start production in early 2020.
In February 2021, Colombian-American actress Sasha Calle was cast as Supergirl in The Flash (2023), directed by Andy Muschietti. In February 2023, it was confirmed Calle would be portraying the Kara Zor-El version of the character.
 A film titled Supergirl: Woman of Tomorrow was announced to be in development at DC Studios in January 2023, as an installment of the DC Universe (DCU). It is based on the 2021 miniseries written by Tom King.

Animation
 Summer Glau voices the post-Crisis version of Kara Zor-El in Superman/Batman: Apocalypse, which is based on the Superman/Batman storyline "The Supergirl from Krypton". Despite this, it was confirmed by director Lauren Montgomery that Supergirl's name was removed from the title due to the much slower sales of the previous Wonder Woman animated movie, and the character was not permitted to appear on the cover in her trademark outfit.
 Molly Quinn voices Supergirl in Superman: Unbound.
 Supergirl appears in Lego DC Comics Super Heroes: Justice League: Cosmic Clash, voiced by Jessica DiCicco.
 Supergirl appears in Legion of Super-Heroes, voiced by Meg Donnelly.

Video games
 Supergirl appears in DC Universe Online, voiced by Adriene Mishler. In the villain campaign, the players help Doctor Psycho capture Supergirl using Kryptonite. In the hero campaign, the players fight Doctor Psycho to save Supergirl. Under the thrall of Brainiac, she must be defeated in the Fortress of Solitude: Power Core raid.
 Supergirl is unlockable in Lego Batman 2: DC Super Heroes, voiced by Bridget Hoffman.
 Supergirl makes a cameo appearance in the IOS version of Injustice: Gods Among Us as a support card.
 Supergirl appears as a playable character in Lego Batman 3: Beyond Gotham, voiced by Kari Wahlgren. She is playable in her default variant which is designed after her appearance in The New 52 and in her Classic attire. Her Classic variant is unlocked in a VR Mission while her New 52 variant is unlocked in a Hub Quest in Nok where she requests players to defeat a number of enemies she accidentally releases from their cells.
 Supergirl appears as a playable character in Infinite Crisis, voiced by Camilla Luddington.
 Supergirl appears as a playable character and the central protagonist in Injustice 2 by NetherRealm Studios, the sequel to Injustice: Gods Among Us, voiced by Laura Bailey. Here her origin is much like in the comics where she is sent along with her cousin Kal-El to Earth by her mother after Krypton is destroyed but on separate pods where hers veers off-course after sustaining significant damage, stranding her in space for many years until she lands on Earth, unaged. When the main storyline starts, she is residing on Black Adam's kingdom of Khandaq, apparently under his and Wonder Woman's protection. When Brainiac who was responsible for Krypton's destruction attacks, she, Wonder Woman, and Black Adam attempt to free Superman and the remaining members of the Regime, while being interrupted in their efforts by new Insurgency recruits Blue Beetle and Firestorm until Batman himself arrives and releases Superman, leading to a temporary alliance between the Regime and Insurgency against the alien warlord. Over the course of the story, she learns the truth about her cousin's tyranny and at the end of the game sides with Batman, Green Lantern and Flash in letting Brainiac live to restore the lost cities but is defeated. In Batman's ending, she laments her cousin's tyranny and sees him leave to be imprisoned in the Phantom Zone and is offered membership by Batman in his Justice League. In Superman's ending, she is imprisoned aboard Brainiac's ship and to her shock discovers her cousin has bonded with it and when she refuses his offer to join him in leading his new legion of imprisoned species. He attempts to coerce her by revealing a brainwashed Batman, who had also been captured, further shocking her.
 Supergirl appears as a limited-distribution minifigure for the toys-to-life video game Lego Dimensions, with Kari Wahlgren reprising her role. She has the ability to transform between her classic and Red Lantern forms.
 Supergirl appears as a playable character in DC Unchained.
 Supergirl appears in the PSP version of Justice League Heroes.
 Supergirl appears as a playable character in the DC TV Super-Heroes DLC pack in Lego DC Super-Villains.

See also
 Alternative versions of Supergirl
 Laurel Gand

References

Supergirl
Superman characters
Characters created by Otto Binder
Comics characters introduced in 1958
Comics characters introduced in 1959
DC Comics aliens
DC Comics American superheroes
DC Comics characters who can move at superhuman speeds
DC Comics characters with accelerated healing
DC Comics characters with superhuman senses
DC Comics characters with superhuman strength
DC Comics martial artists
DC Comics female superheroes
DC Comics film characters
DC Comics television characters
DC Comics extraterrestrial superheroes
DC Comics sidekicks
DC Comics orphans
Female characters in television
Fictional characters who can manipulate sound
Fictional characters with absorption or parasitic abilities
Fictional characters with air or wind abilities
Fictional characters with energy-manipulation abilities
Fictional characters with fire or heat abilities
Fictional characters with ice or cold abilities
Fictional characters with nuclear or radiation abilities
Fictional characters with slowed ageing
Fictional characters with superhuman durability or invulnerability
Fictional characters with X-ray vision
Fictional actors
Fictional photographers
Fictional refugees
Fictional reporters
Fictional school counselors
Fictional American secret agents
Fictional waiting staff
Fighting game characters
Kryptonians
Superheroes who are adopted
Time travelers
Vigilante characters in comics
Flamebird